Children of No Importance or The Illegitimate (German: Die Unehelichen) is a 1926 German silent drama film directed by Gerhard Lamprecht and starring Bernhard Goetzke, Margarete Kupfer and Elsa Wagner. It was part of the series of Enlightenment films produced in Weimar Germany, examining social issues such as illegitimate children.

Cast
Bernhard Goetzke
Margarete Kupfer
Elsa Wagner
Jaro Fürth
Ralph Ludwig
Fee Wachsmuth
Margot Misch
Fred Grosser
Hermine Sterler
Max Maximilian
Eduard Rothauser
Lili Schoenborn-Anspach
Paul Bildt
Käthe Haack
Hugo Flink
Ernst Behmer
Karl Platen
Trude Lehmann

References

External links

1926 drama films
Films of the Weimar Republic
German drama films
German silent feature films
Films directed by Gerhard Lamprecht
National Film films
German black-and-white films
Silent drama films
1920s German films
1920s German-language films